Mayors of the town of Dover, Kent, England.

Before the 19th century

September 1371-72: John Halle
1373-74: John Halle
1375-76: John Moony 
1376-78: John Gerold 
1378-80: John Strete
1380-82: John Halle
1382-84: John Gyles
1388-89: John Halle
1389-91: John Gyles
1391-92: John Halle
1392-93: John Gyles
1393-94: John Halle
1399-1400: John Gyles
1401-02: John Gyles
1402-03: Peter Rede 
1403-04: John Monyn 
1404-06: John Strete 
1406-08: Thomas Gyles
1408-11: John Strete 
1411-12: John Enebroke and John Luestroke 
1413-14: Thomas Gyles
1414-15: Thomas Gyles and Walter Stratton
1415-17: John Garton
1417-19: Walter Stratton
1419-21: Thomas atte Crowche
1421-22: Walter Stratton
1422-23: Thomas Arnold
1423-24: Walter Stratton
1424-25: Thomas Arnold
1425-26: John Braban
1426-27: Walter Stratton
1427-28: John Braban
1428-29: Walter Stratton
1429-30: William Brewys
1430-31: Thomas Arnold
1431-33: Walter Stratton
1433-35: John Braban
1435-36: John Braban and William Brewys
1436-40: William Brewys
1439-40: Walter Stratton
1440-41: William Brewys
1441-43: John Warde
1443-44: William Brewys
1444-45: Ralph Toke
1445-49: Ralph Toke and Thomas Gore
1449-50: Thomas Gore
1450-51: Thomas Gore and Richard Grigge
1451-53: Richard Grigge
1453-56: Thomas Doyley
1456-58: Thomas Gore
1458-60: Nicholas Burton
1460-61: Richard Palmer
1461-62: Thomas Gore and Richard Palmer
1462-63: Thomas Gore
1463-64: Richard Palmer
1464-65: Thomas Pety
1465-66: Thomas Gore
1466-67: Thomas Gore and Richard Palmer
1467-68: Richard Palmer
1468-70: Thomas Hexstall
1470-71: Thomas Hexstall and Thomas Toke
1471-72: Richard Palmer and Thomas Hexstall
1472-74: Thomas Hexstall and Thomas Toke
1474-75: Thomas Hexstall
1475-76: Richard Pleysington
1476-77: Robert Vyncent
1477-78: Thomas Hexstall and Robert Vyncent
1478-79: Thomas Toke and Thomas Hexstall
1479-80: Richard Palmer 
1480-81: Thomas Fouche
1481-82: Thomas Hexstall and Thomas Fouche
1482-85: John Byngham
1485-86: Robert Vyncent 
1486-87: John Templeman
1487-88: John Byngham
1488-89: - Unknown
1489-90: Robert Vyncent
1490-91: Edward Hexstall
1491-92: Robert Vyncent
1492-93: Henry Balgy
1493-94: William Warren
1494-96: Edward Hexstall
1496-97: Richard Fyneaux
1497-99: John Byngham
1499-01: William Stone
1501-02: John Pocock
1502-04: Richard Fyneaux
1504-05: Oliver Lythgo
1505-06: Robert Nethersole
1506-07: Edward Hexstall
1507-08: Richard Fyneaux
1508-09: Robert Nethersole
1509-10: Richard Monin
1510-11: Nicholas Templeman
1511-12: John Broke
1512-13: Robert Nethersole
1513-14: Nicholas Aldy
1514-15: Richard Fyneaux
1515-16: Thomas Vaughan
1516-17: Nicholas Aldy and John Gregorie
1517-18: Nicholas Aldy
1518-19: Robert Weltden
1519-20: Thomas Vaughan
1520-21: John Elam
1521-22: John Elam and Robert Stelman
1522-23: Robert Stelman
1523-24: Robert Dyer
1524-25: John Broke
1525-26: John Warren
1526-27: Richard Crouch
1527-28: Thomas Vaughan
1528-29: Robert Fluce and Rouse Buskins
1529-30: Robert Fluce
1530-32: Robert Nethersole
1532-33: Thomas Vaughan and Thomas Foxley
1533-35: Edward May
1535-36: John Payntor
1536-37: John Warren 
1537-38: Ralph Buffkin
1538-39: Edward May
1539-40: John Bowles
1540-41: John Warren and John Bowles
1541-42: Thomas Foxley
1542-43: Thomas Foxley and Robert Justice
1543-44: John Elam 
1544-45: William Fisher
1545-46: Thomas Colly
1546-47: Richard Fyneaux and Thomas Colly
1547-48: Richard Fyneaux, Hugo Brackett and Thomas Mauncell
1548-49: Hugo Brackett and Thomas Warren
1549-50: Thomas Mauncell and Thomas Warren
1550-51: Thomas Portway, MP of Dover, 1553
1551-52: Robert Justice, Thomas Portway and Robert Justin
1552-54: Thomas Fynnett
1554-55: Richard Elam and William Hannington
1555-56: Adrian Whitt and Richard Elary
1556-57: Adrian Whitt
1557-58: Thomas Warren
1558-59: Thomas Colly
1559-60: Thomas Pepper
1560-61: Richard Gibbs
1561-62: William Hannington
1562-63: John Robins
1563-64: Thomas Pepper and John Robins
1564-65: William Burden
1565-66: Thomas Pepper
1566-67: Thomas Watson
1567-68: Thomas Pepper
1568-69: John Edwards
1569-70: Richard Elam
1570-71: Thomas Burnell
1571-74: Thomas Andrews
1574-75: Thomas Andrews and Thomas Warren
1575-76: John Robins
1576-77: John Lucas
1577-79: Robert Fynnett
1579-80: Thomas Allyn
1580-82: John Garrett
1582-83: Thomas Andrews and Thomas Warren
1583-84: Thomas Andrews and William Willis
1584-85: Thomas Watson
1585-86: William Willis
1586-88: Thomas Brodgatte
1588-89: John Tench 
1589-90: Henry Leonard
1590-91: Jeffery Glydd
1591-92: Humphrey Meade
1592-93: Thomas Elwood
1593-94: Robert Burnett
1594-95: John Skaythe
1595-97: George Bynge
1597-98: William Leonard
1598-99: Jeremy Garrett
1599-1600: Edward Kempe
1600-01: John Bachelor
1601-02: John Bradgate
1602-03: Richard Siseley
1603-04: William Nethersole
1604-06: George Bynge
1606-07: John Tooke
1607-08: Henry Steede
1608-09: Robert Garrett
1609-10: Robert Austin
1610-12: William Leonard
1612-13: Edward Kempe (died whilst in office) and William Warde
1613-14: William Warde
1614-15: Robert Garrett
1615-16: John Waade
1616-17: Thomas Foord
1617-18: Nicholas Eaton
1618-20: William Ward

19th century

 1838: Michael Elwin
 1839: William Cocke
 1840-1: Edward Poole
 1842-5: William Clarke
 1846: William Cocke
 1863 -1864: Captain Jeffery Wheelock Noble, R.N.
 1867: Joseph George Churchward Postal merchant between France, England and Belgium

1872: Edward Ruttley Mowll, wine and spirits merchant

20th century
1900-01: Sir William Henry Crundall
1901-02: Henry Martyn Mowll, solicitor
1902-03: Frederick George Wright (Conservative)
1903-04: Arthur Thomas Walmisley
1904-05: Sir William Henry Crundall
1905-06: William Wood Burkett
1906-07: George Francis Raggett
1907-10: Walter L Emden
1910-11: Sir William Henry Crundall
1911-13: William Bromley
1913-19: Edwin W. T. Farley

21st century
Source: Dover Town Council
2000: Gordon Cowan
2001: Diane G Smallwood
2002: Diane G Smallwood
2003: George P Allt
2004: Robert R Markham
2005: Kenneth Tranter
2006: Janet F Tranter
2007: Robert R Markham
2008: Diane G Smallwood
2009: Sue Jones
2010: Sue Jones
2011: Veronica Philpott
2012: Anne Smith
2013: Veronica Philpott
2014: Pamela Brivio
2015: Chris Precious 
2016: Neil Rix 
2017: Neil Rix
2018: Sue Jones
2019: Gordon Cowan

References

Dover, Kent
Kent-related lists
Dover